Evren Celimli (born May 2, 1971) is an American composer and producer of music for modern dance, theater, film and the concert hall. His music has been heard throughout the U.S. and Europe at music festivals, in theaters and film festivals.

Biography
Evren began violin lessons in grade school and took music theory, piano, and composition lessons at the New England Conservatory extension school at 11 years old. He graduated from Brandeis University in 1993, where he studied with Eric Chasalow and received an
M.A. at Sussex University, where he studied with Michael Finnissy.

Evren wrote the soundtrack to Beyond Belief (2007), a film that follows two widows of the September 11, 2001 attack on the World Trade Center in New York City.

He has worked with many New York City based choreographers, including Ben Munisteri, Doug Elkins, and Murray Spalding, for whom he is currently composer-in-residence. Evren received the Stockhausen Prize from Sussex University and First Prize from the Harvard Musical Association as well as the Reiner Composition Prize from Brandeis University two years in a row.

References

External links
 Evren Celimli
 

American male composers
21st-century American composers
Living people
1971 births
Musicians from New York City
21st-century American male musicians